A bolt is a piece of cloth woven on a loom or created by a knitting machine, as it is processed, stored and/or marketed.  Consequently, its dimensions are highly variableflexible and dependent upon the manufacturing, machinery, quantity, size, thickness and quality of the product.  It is a unit used in manufacturing, transport and inventory.  It is also used as a descriptor for wallpaper, which uses different fabrication machinery. Being encompassing, it is by its nature a generic and ambiguous term of convenience and context, used to describe fabric and wallpaper.

In modern production 
Textile manufacturing is about converting fiber into yarn, yarn into fabric, and finally, the fabric into clothing and other useful products. At every stage, production activity is managed by unique batches. When it comes to fabric, a set of bolts or rolls forms a batch, representing the production.

Manufacturing 
The yarn is processed by knitting or weaving, which turns the yarn into cloth. The machine used for weaving is the loom. and knitting is another method of cloth manufacturing.

Boltsare the rolls of cloth manufactured by a loom or knitting machine, which moves through subsequent processes of textile finishing.

Loom 
Looms are equipped with devices that can measure the length of the bolt during manufacturing on the machine itself.

Packing and Trading 
Cloth merchant were marking the end of bolts with notations. This practice is continued in the industry  to avoid mixing.

Garment manufacturing 
After fabric inspection, the bolts are layered manually or fabric-spreading machines for relaxing and cutting with patterns.

For more information, see Pattern; Ready-made garment

Unit 

The length of a bolt varied according to the type of material measured.  The length is usually either , but varies depending on the fabric being referred to; for example, a bolt of canvas is traditionally . 

For more on breadths of bolts, see narrow cloth.

The word has been long-lived.  For example, Herman Melville, “All Astir”, in Moby-Dick; or, The Whale, 1st American edition wrote: "Not only were the old sails being mended, but new sails were coming on board, and bolts of canvas, and coils of rigging; in short, everything betokened that the ship's preparations were hurrying to a close."  It is also the standard linear measurement of canvas for use at sea: .

See also 

 Piece goods
Greige goods
Fabric inspection

References

Notes

Citations

Bibliography

Further reading

Customary units of measurement in the United States
Units of length
Textiles